William "Billy" Graulich (July 24, 1868 – August 12, 1948) was an American catcher and first baseman in Major League Baseball who played for the Philadelphia Phillies in its 1891 season. He was born in Philadelphia, Pennsylvania.

Graulich made six game appearances for the Phillies in his only major league season, getting eight hits in 26 at bats for a .308 average.

He died in 1948 in his hometown of Philadelphia at the age of 80.

Sources

External links
Career statistics and player information from Baseball Reference, or Retrosheet

1868 births
1948 deaths
19th-century baseball players
Major League Baseball catchers
Major League Baseball first basemen
Baseball players from Philadelphia